Nikolay Karasyov may refer to:
 Nikolay Karasyov (shot putter) (born 1939), Russian Olympic shot putter
 Nikolay Karasyov (rower) (born 1927), Russian Olympic rower